WQEZ (1370 AM) is a radio station  broadcasting a soft adult contemporary format. Licensed to Fort Campbell, Kentucky, United States, the station serves the Clarksville-Hopkinsville area.  The station is currently owned by the Five Star Media Group subsidiary of Saga Communications through licensee Saga Communications of Tuckessee, LLC.  Its tower and transmitter located on Stateline Road in Oak Grove, Kentucky immediately outside the main gates of the Ft. Campbell, Kentucky military installation.

History

The station went on the air as WABD in 1968 broadcasting a top-40 station appealing to soldiers and their families on Ft. Campbell.  In the late 1970s, album rock moved to WABD-FM and the AM became oldies.

The stations were sold in 1986 to Southern Broadcasting of Clarksville, Tennessee, with Tom Cassetty, president and general manager.  WABD-FM changed call letters to WCVQ-FM and was upgraded to 100,000 kilowatts with a 950-foot tower and became known as Q-108, a gold-based adult contemporary sound with the urban format moved to the AM. Southern sold the stations to Saga Communications, Inc., the current owner and operator.

Leo Wilson of Hopkinsville helped build the station and Gary L. Latham was president and general manager.  In addition to Latham, Shelby McCallum and Kentucky Governor Ned Breathitt were partners in the station, whose call letters stood for "Airborne Division", in honor of the 101st Airborne Division stationed at nearby Ft. Campbell, Kentucky.

Today the station's studios and offices are located in Clarksville, Tennessee co-located with WVVR FM 100.3, WCVQ-FM 107.9, WKFN AM 540, WZZP-FM 97.5 and WRND 94.3, a cluster of stations known as the 5 Star Radio Group owned by Saga Communications, Inc.

The station changed its format to all country gospel music on January 1, 2008.

On April 15, 2009, Saga dropped the all country gospel music format to simulcast WEGI-FM "Eagle 94.3 Classic Hits" and changed the call letters to WEGI. They broadcast a new top of the hour FCC ID check as "WEGI-AM 1370, FORT CAMPBELL ... WEGI-FM 94.3 OAK GROVE".

On December 26, 2013, WEGI (along with WEGI-FM) shifted their format to variety hits, branded as "Rewind 94.3". The stations changed their call signs to WRND and WRND-FM, respectively, on December 27, 2013.

On April 11, 2018, WRND split from its simulcast with WRND-FM and changed their format to soft adult contemporary, branded as "EZ 99.9" under new WQEZ calls. The 99.9 frequency in the branding is for FM translator W260DH 99.9 FM Fort Campbell.

References

External links

RND (AM)
Radio stations established in 1968
1968 establishments in Kentucky
Soft adult contemporary radio stations in the United States